Ust-Kamyshenka is a rural locality (a selo) in Kabanovsky Selsoviet, Ust-Kalmansky District, Altai Krai, Russia. The population was 344 as of 2013. There are 9 streets.

Geography 
Ust-Kamyshenka is located 17 km southwest of Ust-Kalmanka (the district's administrative centre) by road. Ponomarevo is the nearest rural locality.

References 

Rural localities in Ust-Kalmansky District